The University of Maryland men's basketball team has had ten head coaches in program history, including Naismith Basketball Hall of Fame members Gary Williams and Lefty Driesell. Maryland's longest tenured coach is H. Burton Shipley, who coached from 1923–1946. The team's current head coach is Kevin Willard who was recently hired on March 21, 2022. Prior to that coach Danny Manning served on an interim basis after Mark Turgeon left the team during the 2021–22 season.

All-time Head Coaches

Notes

References

Maryland

Maryland Terrapins basketball, men's, coaches